Long tentacle anemone may refer to several different species of sea anemone:

 Long-tentacled anemone (Anthopleura michaelseni)
 Long tentacle anemone (Macrodactyla doreensis)
 Long tentacle anemone (Sebae anemone)